George E. Pake (April 1, 1924 – March 4, 2004) was a physicist and research executive primarily known for helping founded Xerox PARC.

Early life 
Pake was raised in Kent, Ohio. His father was an English instructor at Kent State University. His mother was a schoolteacher.

Pake was exempted from service in the U.S. Armed Forces during World War II due to scoliosis. He earned bachelor's and master's degrees from the Carnegie Institute of Technology and his doctorate in physics at Harvard University in 1948.

Career 
After four years as a physics professor at Washington University in St. Louis, Pake became the head of the physics department at age 28. He later went on to become provost of the university from 1962 to 1970 before leaving to serve as founding director of Xerox PARC.

Pake served on the President's Science Advisory Committee (1965-1969). He was president of the American Physical Society in 1977.

PARC assembled a first-rate collection of research talent, especially in the area of computer science. During Pake's years running Xerox PARC, the research center invented the laser printer and pioneered the use of a computer "desktop" which functioned by clicking on "icons." 
This has since become the computer industry standard.

Despite advocacy by Pake, the Xerox Corporation never chose to open a personal computer division. Pake left Xerox in 1986 to direct the nonprofit Institute for Research on Learning in Palo Alto. He remained director emeritus until the time of his death.

Late in life, Pake began writing two different books, both with the collaborator Andrew Szanton. Pake's death, of heart failure on March 4, 2004, in Tucson, Arizona, interrupted both book projects.

Awards 
In 1986, Pake was awarded the illustrious IRI Medal from the Industrial Research Institute for recognition of his leadership in the field of technology and innovation. Pake was also a recipient of the National Medal of Science in 1987 and continued to visit PARC long after his 1986 retirement from Xerox.

George E. Pake Prize 
Since 1984, the American Physical Society has been awarding the George E. Pake Prize, endowed in 1983 by the Xerox Corporation, to recognize outstanding work by physicists combining original research accomplishments with leadership in the management of research or development in industry.

Personal life 
Pake married Marjorie Semon on May 31, 1947; they had four children: Warren, Bruce, Cathie and Steve.

References

External links
George Pake, Xerox PARC founder, dies (almanacnews.com)

1924 births
2004 deaths
People from Kent, Ohio
People from Jefferson, Ohio
20th-century American physicists
Carnegie Mellon University alumni
Harvard University alumni
National Medal of Science laureates
Washington University in St. Louis faculty
Washington University physicists
Physicists from Missouri
Scientists from St. Louis
Scientists from Missouri
Scientists at PARC (company)
Fellows of the American Physical Society
Members of the National Academy of Medicine
Presidents of the American Physical Society